The Belchen Tunnel is a motorway tunnel in Switzerland, and forms part of the A2 motorway from Basel to Chiasso. It links Eptingen in the canton of Basel-Country with Hägendorf in the Canton of Solothurn.

The "white woman"

In January 1981 a modern myth circulated, dealing with a "white woman" (weisse Frau) of the Bölchentunnel. Shaped as an old white-clothed hitchhiking woman, a ghost (though not initially recognized as such) appears out of nowhere in front of the drivers and sometimes even speaks to them.

The first known Belchen ghost was actually male. The first written reports of the phenomenon, dated June 1980, involve a male hitchhiker who was picked up but eventually vanished from the vehicle, despite the driver's high speed.

Towards the end of 1980, the "white woman" began appearing in or near the tunnel. On January 6, 1981, the tabloid Blick wrote about the sightings, followed by other media also adopting the story. Basel Police received many phone calls, dozens of which had to be logged.

The Bölchengespenst, or "Bölchen ghost", became a popular subject for 1981's Shrove Tuesday carnival. Even the musicians of the Oberbaselbieter Ländlerkapelle discussed the legend. Reports of the ghost then dwindled, until the 1983 edition of the book Baselbieter Sagen reported further sightings of the white woman. Two female jurists picked up an inconspicuously dressed, clumsy, pale, middle-aged woman in Eptingen. When they later asked her if she was feeling better, she answered:

When they looked at the back seat, the woman had disappeared.

Other variations
Such visitations don't only happen inside or around tunnels. A re-edited edition of the Baselbieter Sagen mentions similar cases at other Basel places: "the Heidegg castle's lady," "the maiden on the goat," and "the grey woman in Zunzgen." In Läufelfingen, the woman wears a green loden coat. In the Canton of Bern, a girl in a short leather jacket appears. In the area of Basel, as with the case in Tenniken, a man wearing black is seen. The man prophesizes an earthquake and a hard winter before disappearing. The mysterious hitchhikers can even disappear if the car has only front doors and no back doors.

A 1981 article in the magazine Schweizer Volkskunde describes analogous visitations. According to it, such "modern ghosts of the road" were seen in other Swiss Cantons and tunnels, such as the Luzernerland area and in Toggenburg.

See also
Haunted road
Vanishing hitchhiker
Urban legend

References

External links
"Plötzlich war die Frau weg, fort, einfach nicht mehr da" Volksstimme, 25 January 2001 

Buildings and structures in Basel-Landschaft
Buildings and structures in the canton of Solothurn
Transport in Basel-Landschaft
Transport in the canton of Solothurn
Road tunnels in Switzerland